The Seal of the City of Los Angeles is, since 1905, the official seal of the City of Los Angeles, a city located in the southern portion of the U.S. state of California.

The escutcheon is encircled by the legal name of the city (City of Los Angeles) and year founded (1781). It was adopted on March 27, 1905, via Ordinance 10,834.

Symbolism
The heraldic blazon of the coat of arms, as declared in the 1905 ordinance, is: Inside the ribbon, flanking the escutcheon, are grapes, olives, and oranges, major crops of California, on their plants. These are also symbolized in the colors of the flag of Los Angeles. The fruit are on a field or, bordered with a 77-bead rosary, which represents Spanish missions in California.

The arms are quarterly:
 1st quarter: the lesser coat of arms of the United States. A field paleways of thirteen pieces argent and gules; chief, azure charged with thirteen five rays argent.
 2nd quarter: the flag of the California Republic (1846) A field argent with a bear gules at bay, five rays gules, and fess base gules, sans text and ground.
 3rd quarter: the coat of arms of Mexico (1823-1864). An eagle displayed reguardant and biting a serpent, symbolizing Mexican rule from 1822 until 1846.
 4th quarter: the lesser coat of arms of Spain (1785-1873). The coats of arms of Castile and León, symbolizing Spanish rule from 1542 until 1821.

See also
 List of U.S. county and city insignia

References
 The City Seal of Los Angeles at the University of Dayton
 The Forgotten Legacy of Los Angeles, the “City of Vines” at the California Historical Society
 Understanding The Los Angeles City Seal at Los Angeles Times

External links

 Seal of the City of Los Angeles at the City of Los Angeles (lacity.org)

1905 establishments in California
Coats of arms with bears
Coats of arms with buildings
Coats of arms with cacti
Coats of arms with crowns
Coats of arms with eagles
Coats of arms with flags
Coats of arms with fruit
Coats of arms with grapes
Coats of arms with lions
Coats of arms with snakes
Coats of arms with stars
Seal
Municipal coats of arms in California
Official seals of places in California
Symbols introduced in 1905